Havurat Shalom is a small egalitarian chavurah in Somerville, Massachusetts. Founded in 1968, it is not affiliated with the major Jewish denominations.

Havurat Shalom was the first countercultural Jewish community and set the precedent for the national havurah movement.  Founded in 1968, it was also significant in the development of the Jewish renewal movement and Jewish feminism.  Originally intended to be an "alternative seminary", instead it evolved into a "model havurah".

Founders and members of Havurat Shalom have included Edward Feld, Merle Feld, Michael Fishbane, Everett Gendler, Arthur Green, Barry Holtz, Gershon Hundert,  James Kugel, Alfred A. Marcus, Zalman Schachter-Shalomi, Jim Sleeper, Michael Strassfeld, and Arthur Waskow. Historian Jonathan Sarna noted that among these members were "the people who would be leading figures in Jewish life in the second half of the 20th century".

References

Havurat Shalom Siddur
Sarna, Jonathan. "'With-It' Judaism: The havurah movement and The Jewish Catalog blended Judaism with the 1960s counterculture" in American Judaism: A History (Yale University Press, 2004). Internet reprint
Richard Siegel, Strassfeld, Michael and Sharon. The Jewish Catalog: A Do-It-Yourself Kit 1973

External links

Jewish organizations established in the 1960s
Jewish organizations based in the United States
Jews and Judaism in Massachusetts
Organizations based in Massachusetts
Somerville, Massachusetts
Jewish Renewal
Non-denominational Judaism